Raiders of the Living Dead is a 1986 American horror film directed by Samuel M. Sherman from a script he co-wrote with Brett Piper.

Plot
In an abandoned prison, a doctor revived executed convicts as the living dead. Jonathan (Scott Schwartz), a teenager, creates a weapon from a LaserDisc player's laser and pursues the walking dead, aided by his girlfriend and grandfather. A reporter on the trail of the story is helped by the town librarian. On the prison island, the zombies attack a security guard and tear him apart as the reporter and teenager venture into the prison caverns for a final showdown.

Cast
 Scott Schwartz as Jonathan
 Robert Deveau as Morgan Randall 
 Donna Asali as Shelly Godwin 
 Robert Allen as Dr. Corstairs
 Zita Johann as Librarian 
 Corri Burt as Michelle   
 Bob Sacchetti as Man in Black

Production
This film originally started in New Hampshire in 1983 by co-writer Brett Piper under the title Graveyard. It was later completed in three weeks by writer-producer Samuel Sherman. Veteran actress Zita Johann came out of retirement to appear in one scene as an elderly historian.

Release
The film was not shown theatrically in the United States until May 28, 2017, at a special screening at the Mahoning Drive-In Theater in Lehighton, Pennsylvania, with producer/director Samuel M. Sherman in attendance.

The film was given a two-disc special edition DVD release in the United States by Image Entertainment in 2003. This version is currently out of print.  This set contains three version of the film:

Version 1: the first cut called Dying Day, directed by Brett Piper
Version 2: the second cut called Dark Night, directed by Brett Piper
Version 3: the third cut called Raiders of the Living Dead, featuring new footage shot by Sherman

The film was released on DVD in the United Kingdom in 2003. This version features solely Raiders of the Living Dead and its commentary.

References

External links

1986 films
1986 horror films
American independent films
American zombie films
1980s English-language films
1980s American films